The Shatsky Rise is Earth's third largest oceanic plateau, (after Ontong Java and Kerguelen) located in the north-west Pacific Ocean  east of Japan.  It is one of a series of Pacific Cretaceous large igneous provinces (LIPs) together with Hess Rise, Magellan Rise, and Ontong Java-Manihiki-Hikurangi.
It was named for Nikolay Shatsky (1895-1960), a Soviet geologist, expert in tectonics of ancient platforms.

The rise consists of three large volcanic massifs, Tamu, Ori, and Shirshov, but, in contrast, there are few traces of magmatism on the surrounding ocean floor. Tamu Massif is likely the largest volcano yet discovered on Earth.

Extent and volume
Furthermore, the crustal thickness between the massifs of the Shatsky Rise is almost twice that of normal crust thickness.

Subsidence
After its formation Shatsky Rise was uplifted  and it then subsided , which, in both cases, is considerably more than the Ontong-Java Plateau.  There was least subsidence at the centre of the Tamu Massif, subsidence increased at the northern flank of the Tamu Massif and at the Ori Massif, and it becomes greatest at the flank of Ori Massif.  The cause of this gradual increase in subsidence can be underplating beneath Tamu Massif.  There was much less subsidence at Shirshov Massif farther north which probably represents a later, different phase of volcanism.

Origin controversy
Scientific studies of the size, shape, and eruption rate of the Shatsky Rise have concluded that the rise originated from a mantle plume, whereas studies of magnetic lineations and plate tectonic reconstructions have shown that it must have originated near a triple junction and drifted up to  during the Early Cretaceous (140–100 Ma).  A 2016 study concluded that the Tamu Massif formed at a mid-ocean ridge that interacted with a plume head and that the Ori Massif formed off-axis probably from a plume tail.

Shatsky Rise formed at a triple junction, but the thickness of the plateau coupled with the depth and intensity of melting is different from those of MORB (mid-ocean ridge basalt), making a recycled mantle slab a more likely source.  A decrease in magma volume with time is more consistent with the involvement of a mantle plume.

Tectonic history
It formed during the Late Jurassic and Early Cretaceous at the Pacific–Farallon–Izanagi triple junction, probably making it the oldest unaltered ocean plateau.  Because this occurred before the so-called Cretaceous silent period, a long period without magnetic reversals, its formation can be precisely dated.
Magnetic lineations on and surrounding Shatsky Rise range from M21 (147 Ma) at the south-western edge to M1 (124 Ma) at the northern tip.

The Shatsky Rise LIP erupted at the location of the Pacific–Farallon–Izanagi triple junction  147–143 Ma either because a mantle plume reached the surface or because of decompression melting at a mid-ocean ridge.

A set of magnetic lineations, called the Hawaiian lineations, between Shatsky Rise, Hess Rise, and the Mid-Pacific Mountains, formed during the spreading between the Pacific and Farallon plates 156–120 Ma.  North of Shatsky Rise the so-called Japanese lineations are oriented in another direction and the differences in orientations trace the path of the Pacific–Farallon–Izanagi triple junction.

The triple junction moved north-west before M22 (150 Ma) after-which it started to reorganise, a microplate formed and the triple junction made an  eastward jump to the oldest part of the rise, the TAMU Massif.  The remainder of Shatsky Rise formed before M3 (126 Ma) along the trace of the triple junction.  Shaktsky volcanism was episodic and tied to at least nine ridge jumps from this episode.

The volume of the rise decreases along the trace of the triple junction.  The TAMU Massif at the southern end has an estimated volume of  whereas both ORI and Shirshov (136 Ma) attained .  Papanin Ridge, the north end of the rise, has a volume of  but was probably emplaced over a longer period (131–124 Ma).

The conjugates of the Shatsky and Hess rises on the Farallon Plate were most likely involved in the Laramide orogeny; the former subducted beneath North America and the latter below northern Mexico.

References

Notes

Sources

 
 
 
 
 
 
 
 
 
 
 

Large igneous provinces
Plateaus of the Pacific Ocean
Supervolcanoes